Wadi Hammeh 27 is a Late Epipalaeolithic archaeological site in Pella, Jordan. It consists of the remains of a large settlement dating to the Early Natufian period, about 14,500 to 14,000 years ago.

The people of the Natufian culture were nomadic foragers, but at Wadi Hammeh 27 they built large, durable dwellings that were maintained and revisited over many generations. The excavators of the site therefore interpret it as a substantial 'base camp' and forerunner of the first sedentary villages that were established in the area in the succeeding Pre-Pottery Neolithic period.

References

Further reading

External Links 
Photos of Wadi Hemmeh at the American Center of Research

Archaeological sites in Jordan
Natufian sites